Calamoceratidae is a family of caddisflies in the order Trichoptera. There are about 9 genera and at least 120 described species in  the family Calamoceratidae.

ITIS Taxonomic note: 
Type genus: Calamoceras F Brauer, 1865.

Genera
 Anisocentropus McLachlan, 1863
 Ascalaphomerus Walker, 1852
 Banyallarga Navas, 1916
 Calamoceras Brauer, 1865
 Ganonema McLachlan, 1866
 Georgium Fischer, 1964
 Heteroplectron McLachlan, 1871
 Phylloicus Mueller, 1880
 Silvatares Navás, 1931

References

Further reading

 
 
 
 
 
 
 
 

Trichoptera families
Integripalpia